The Dukes of Broxstonia is an Australian animated series which aired over 3 seasons.

Series overview

Episode list

Season 1 (2010–11)

Season 2 (2011–12)

Season 3 (2013)

References

http://kidscreen.com/2013/04/15/dukes-of-broxstonia-returns-in-longer-format/

Lists of Australian animated television series episodes